The 2020 Afghanistan Provincial Challenge Cup was a Limited-overs competition that took place in Afghanistan between 13 and 22 August 2020. It was the fourth year of domestic List A cricket to be played in Afghanistan, following the announcements by the International Cricket Council (ICC) in February and May 2017. However, despite the 2019 edition of the Provincial Challenge Cup having List A status, the same was not applied to the 2020 edition. Eight teams qualified for the tournament, and were divided into two groups of four.

Khost Province won the tournament, after beating defending champions Nangarhar Province by five wickets in the final, with Shahidullah scoring a century.

Points table

Pool A

 Team qualified for the finals

Pool B

 Team qualified for the finals

Fixtures

Group A

Group B

Finals

References

External links
 Series home at ESPN Cricinfo

Ghazi